The Men's 5000 metres T11 event at the 2016 Summer Paralympics took place at the Rio Olympic Stadium on 8 September.
 
The event was undertaken as a single final for all competitors, using guides. It was the first medal awarded at the 2016 Summer Paralympics, and was won by Kenya's Samwel Mushai Kimani, holding off the host's world champion Odair Santos, who took silver ahead of Kenyan Wilson Bii.

Results

 
Q = qualified by place. q = qualified by time. DQ = disqualified RR = Regional Record. PB = Personal Best. SB = Seasonal Best. DNF = Did not finish. DNS = Did not start.

References

Athletics at the 2016 Summer Paralympics
2016 in men's athletics